From its beginnings, St John Ambulance employed ranks and insignia to distinguish grades within its membership and management structure; these were extended across the wider organisation following its merge with the St John Ambulance Association to form St John Ambulance. Based upon the British Army officer and the British Army other ranks structure and insignia, the original ranks and insignia have been subject to several modifications over the history of the organisation.

The basic "star" or "pip" has at its centre the eight-point Maltese Cross, the badge of the Order of St John. The crown used is also that of the Order. At the higher general list ranks, crossed stretchers are used rather than the crossed sword and baton of military use. Insignia are in silver, again symbolic of the Order of St. John.

Also, officers who hold rank within the organisation at or above R4 wear a cockade in their hat (women) and have a silver bar (men), however at or above R3 wear a cockade and tuft (women) and silver bar and Wort cap (men).

Since the mid-1990s the former "Senior NCO" and "Warrant Officer" ranks have been abolished. These ranks, whose titles were "Staff Sergeant", "Corps Sergeant Major", and "County (or District or Bailiwick) Sergeant Major" were deemed too militaristic in form although a few previous incumbents remain. Their demise has gone hand in hand with a lowering of emphasis on parading and drill. The county Sergeant Major, if the county has appointed one, wears member rank slides and Warrant Officer Class 2 (St John Crown in laurel leaves) arm badges on the bottom of each arm.

Nurses used to wear Rhodium Metal bars on their Shoulder Straps. A red enamelled bar denoted a State Registered Nurse (SRN). 
A purple enamelled bar denoted a State Certified Midwife (SCM) and/or a Nurse on the Special Part of the State Register i.e. psychiatric or learning disability). A green enamelled bar denoted a State Enrolled Nurse (SEN). 
Their use was abandoned in the mid-1990s.

In 2012, one Warrant Officer Class 1 (wearing Royal Arms badges in silver on both arms) was appointed at National HQ to advise on ceremonial matters across St John Ambulance.

In December 2013, as a result of the rank review, a simplified rank structure was introduced, being fully implemented by the end of March 2014. The aim of the new rank structure is to ensure that rank is applied consistently throughout the organisation and that it is applied only based on an individual's role. A number of ranks will cease to exist as a result of this change, and the requirements for many of the remaining ranks will change.

In December 2016, it was announced that effective 1 January 2017, no rank is to be worn on events, except by persons who are performing an operational management role at that event. Persons who are undertaking an operational management role, but who do not have rank, will continue to not wear rank. Persons who do have rank, but who are not in an operational management role at the event should not display their rank.

National variations
Whilst this article uses English St John Ambulance practice as standard, inevitably national variations in rank structure have occurred as the organisation has spread to other countries, and subsequently developed in those countries with a degree of autonomy. The English types are presented in the illustrative tables below. Ranks in other countries are usually similar, but adopt local terminology such as (for example) "Provincial Commissioner" instead of "County Commissioner". There may also be fewer ranks in smaller countries, as a result of the need for fewer rungs of management structure.

Unique Rank Slide Specifications

In 2013, St John Ambulance UK rolled out a new design of rank slide. While the insignia, colours and text font remain unchanged, the slides themselves are now much longer and wider, with insignia being much larger. This updated design for rank slides corresponds with the rise of the Service Delivery Uniform (SDU), rolled out in 2011. This is the first modification to the design of the rank slides since the change from cloth and thread to rubber-made rank slides with a new font for 'St John Ambulance' title on all slides.

This was later abandoned.

Role-Based Variations 

In a similar fashion to the Police, St John Ambulance used to have a number of role-based variations on the standard rank markings detailed below. For large-scale events where a Gold, Silver, Bronze command structure is used, the Silver and Bronze commanders used to wear white and orange rank slides respectively. This is no longer the case. 

The organisation has a number of specially trained Medical Response Team volunteers who operate in dense crowds. The teams operate in units of 3 with a designated Supervisor, Clinical Lead and an Operator.  Overall command and control are maintained by a 'Bronze' officer.  St John Ambulance Medical Response Teams remain unranked.

Rank tables

Rank review
In December 2013 St John Ambulance officially announced its conclusion of the rank review that it had undertaken, subsequently issuing advisory documents to its members with detailed explanations.

The review was developed to ensure that consistent and appropriate use of rank for positions, from the Unit up to the senior volunteers at National Headquarters. All existing ranks were removed and the new structure applied.

Non-Commission Officer (NCO) ranks
As a result of this rank review, it was decided to remove all NCO ranks for adult volunteers and staff across the organisation.

Whilst these ranks have been removed for adult volunteers and staff, they still remain in place for Cadets.

Assistants and deputies
As a result of this review, Assistants and Deputies are no longer permitted through St John Ambulance, however additional team members may be added for geographical coverage.

References

See also
Service Medal of the Order of St John
Insignia of the Venerable Order of St John

Non-military rank insignia
Ranks and Insignia
England-related lists